The Jiaxian Bridge is an arch bridge in Jiaxian District, Kaohsiung, Taiwan. It crosses the Qishan River.

History
In August 2009, the original bridge was torn down by Typhoon Morakot. Soon afterwards, the bridge was reconstructed and was officially opened in June 2010 in a ceremony attended by President Ma Ying-jeou and Kaohsiung County Magistrate Yang Chiu-hsing.

Architecture
The bridge is an arch bridge with a sculpture of taro located at the bridgehead. It is painted with light purple color. It spans over a length of 300 meters and a width of 21 meters. It was constructed with a cost of NT$560 million.

Transportation
The bridge is part of Southern Cross-Island Highway.

See also
 List of bridges in Taiwan

References

Arch bridges in Taiwan
Bridges in Kaohsiung